Oatmeal creme pies were the first Little Debbie snack cake commercially produced by McKee Foods. The snack consists of two soft oatmeal cookies stuffed with fluffy creme filling. 

Along with other Little Debbie snacks, oatmeal creme pies are sold in the United States, Canada, Mexico, and Puerto Rico. In December 2020, Kellogg's released a Little Debbie Oatmeal Creme Pies Cereal.

History 
The oatmeal creme pie was created by Oather "O.D." McKee in 1935 during the middle of the Great Depression. At the time, McKee was working at Jack's Cookies, a local bakery in Chattanooga, Tennessee that made oatmeal, raisin, and vanilla cookies which sold for one cent each. McKee and his wife, Ruth, had recently purchased the bakery and were looking for ways to expand business. McKee had an idea to boost sales by offering a new product, an oatmeal sandwich cookie, which he sold for a nickel. The new oatmeal sandwich cookie modified the original oatmeal cookie recipe by using a soft cookie instead of a hard cookie. To complete the sandwich, McKee added a fluffy creme filling between the two soft oatmeal cookies. In 1960, McKee founded the Little Debbie brand and began commercially selling oatmeal creme pies in family-pack cartons for 49 cents. Over 14 million oatmeal creme pies were sold in the first 10 months of the snack cake's release.

Nutrition 
Ingredients: Corn Syrup, Enriched Bleached Flour (Wheat Flour, Barley Malt, Niacin, Reduced Iron, Thiamin Mononitrate [Vitamin B1], Riboflavin [Vitamin B2], Folic Acid), Palm and Soybean Oils with TBHQ and Citric Acid to Protect Flavor, Whole Grain Rolled Oats, Sugar, Dextrose, Water, Molasses, Raisin Paste, Contains 2% or Less of Each of the Following: Leavening (Baking Soda, Ammonium Bicarbonate, Sodium Aluminum Phosphate), Whey (Milk), Salt, Soy Lecithin, Corn Starch, Caramel Color, Mono - and Diglycerides, Natural and Artificial Flavors, Polysorbate 60, Sorbitan Monostearate, Dried Eggs, Modified Corn Starch, Sorbic Acid (to Preserve Freshness), Soy Flour, Dried Egg Whites, Annatto Extract, Beta Carotene, Blue 1, Carrageenan, Chocolate, Cocoa Butter, Citric Acid, Cocoa Processed with Alkali, DATEM, High-fructose corn syrup, Malic Acid, Modified Tapioca Starch, Modified Wheat Starch, Nonfat Dry Milk, Palm and Palm Kernel Oil, Pectin, Polysorbate 80, Propylene Glycol Monostearate, Red 40, Rice Flour, Sodium Citrate, Sodium Stearoyl Lactylate, Spices, Titanium Dioxide, Turmeric, Yellow 5.

Allergens: Oatmeal creme pies contain wheat, soy, milk, and egg, with possible traces of peanuts and tree nuts.

One oatmeal creme pie contains 330 calories. 

In Canada in 2022, with a smaller serving size, one OCP contains 170 calories. 

Little Debbie's oatmeal creme pies are kosher.

In popular culture 
Oatmeal creme pies have been mentioned in songs by artists such as Jay-Z, Southern Culture on the Skids, Waka Flocka Flame, and Lil Debbie.

See also 

 Fudge Rounds
 Nutty Bars

References 

Cookies
Oat-based dishes